Philip Yonge DD (1709 – 23 April 1783) was a British clergyman. He was appointed Bishop of Bristol in 1758 and translated to become Bishop of Norwich in 1761; he died in that office in 1783.

Yonge was the son of Francis and Elizabeth Yonge. Francis Yonge was Commissary of the Ordnance during the War of the Spanish Succession, and later the London agent for South Carolina. Yonge was born in Lisbon in 1709. He was educated at Westminster School and Trinity College, Cambridge, and ordained in 1735. He was master of Jesus College, Cambridge (1752–58) and also a canon of Westminster Abbey (1750–1754) and a prebendary of St. Paul's Cathedral (1754–1761).

The diarist Sylas Neville, who was a dissenter, attended a service at Norwich Cathedral on Friday 21 August 1772, and recorded in his diary: 

In 1761 Yonge married Anne, daughter of Calverley Bewicke of Clapham. He died in his house in Upper Grosvenor Street, Mayfair on 23 April 1783 and was buried in the Grosvenor Chapel in Mayfair.

Yonge's contemporaries in Norwich regarded him as extraordinarily idle.

References

1709 births
1783 deaths
Bishops of Bristol
Bishops of Norwich
Alumni of Trinity College, Cambridge
People educated at Westminster School, London
Masters of Jesus College, Cambridge
18th-century Church of England bishops
Cambridge University Orators
Vice-Chancellors of the University of Cambridge
Canons of Westminster